Beška is an islet in Lake Skadar in the Montenegrin municipality of Bar.

Name 
The alternative names of the island include Gorica, Beška Gorica, Beška Velja, Brezavica and Brezovica.

Geography 
With the exception of the monastery, the islet is uninhabited. It was used by the villagers of Donji Murići (Muriq i poshtëm), hence it was considered part of the village's neighbourhoods. In this context, it appears with the name Murići in old maps.

Monastery 

There are two churches in the Beška Monastery built on the island. The older church is St. George's Church, built at the end of the 14th century by Đurađ II Balšić the Lord of Zeta from 1385 to 1403. St. Mary's Church was built in 1438/1439 by his wife, Jelena Balšić.

References 

Islands of Montenegro
Islands of Lake Skadar